Miroslav Preisinger (born 3 February 1991) is a Slovak professional ice hockey player who currently playing for HC Slovan Bratislava of the Slovak Extraliga.

Career statistics

Regular season and playoffs

International

Awards and honors

References

External links

1991 births
Living people
HC '05 Banská Bystrica players
HC Plzeň players
Sarnia Sting players
HK 36 Skalica players
Slovak ice hockey centres
HK Poprad players
HKM Zvolen players
HC Slovan Bratislava players
Ice hockey people from Bratislava
Slovak expatriate ice hockey players in Canada
Slovak expatriate ice hockey players in the Czech Republic